The 2021 Philippine Basketball Association (PBA) Governors' Cup Finals (or PBA Season 46 Governors' Cup Finals) was the best-of-7 championship series of the 2021 PBA Governors' Cup, and the conclusion of the conference's playoffs. The playoffs were delayed into 2022 due to the COVID-19 pandemic.

The Barangay Ginebra San Miguel and the Meralco Bolts competed for the 20th Governors' Cup championship and the 130th overall championship contested by the league. This was the fourth time that Barangay Ginebra and Meralco competed for the Governors' Cup championship in the span of six seasons. Barangay Ginebra won the three previous championships against Meralco in 2016, 2017, and 2019. Barangay Ginebra defeated Meralco in six games to win their fourth Governors' Cup title in five seasons. They are the lowest-seeded team since the San Miguel Beermen in the 2019 Commissioner's Cup to win a PBA title. Scottie Thompson was named the Finals' MVP.

Background

Road to the finals

Head-to-head matchup

Series summary

Game summaries

Game 1

Game 2

Game 3

Game 4
Prior to the game, Barangay Ginebra's Scottie Thompson was awarded his first Best Player of the Conference award, and Barangay Ginebra import and Thompson's teammate Justin Brownlee was awarded the Best Import of the Conference award for the second time.

Game 5

Game 6
The game was initially scheduled on April 20, 2022, at Smart Araneta Coliseum, but was later postponed to April 22 as fire broke out in one area of the arena during the preliminary round of the 2021 PBA 3x3 season – Second conference Grand Finals earlier in the day.

Rosters 
{| class="toccolours" style="font-size: 95%; width: 100%;"
|-
! colspan="2" style="background-color: #; color: #; text-align: center;" | Barangay Ginebra San Miguel 2021 PBA Governors' Cup roster
|- style="background-color:#; color: #; text-align: center;"
! Players !! Coaches
|-
| valign="top" |
{| class="sortable" style="background:transparent; margin:0px; width:100%;"
! Pos. !! # !! POB !! Name !! Height !! Weight !! !! College 
|-

  Also serves as Barangay Ginebra's board governor.

{| class="toccolours" style="font-size: 95%; width: 100%;"
|-
! colspan="2" style="background-color: #; color: #; text-align: center;" | Meralco Bolts 2021 PBA Governors' Cup roster
|- style="background-color:#; color: #; text-align: center;"
! Players !! Coaches
|-
| valign="top" |
{| class="sortable" style="background:transparent; margin:0px; width:100%;"
! Pos. !! # !! POB !! Name !! Height !! Weight !! !! College 
|-

Broadcast notes
The Governors' Cup Finals was aired on TV5 with simulcast on PBA Rush (both in standard and high definition). TV5's radio arm, Radyo5 provided the radio play-by-play coverage. The One Sports network did not air games 1 and 2 as it aired the 2022 PVL Open Conference Finals, which happened on the same time as the PBA finals.

One Sports provided online livestreaming via the PusoPilipinas and Smart Sports Facebook pages using the TV5 and PBA Rush feeds respectively.

The PBA Rush broadcast provided English-language coverage of the Finals.

Additional Game 6 crew:
Trophy presentation: Jutt Sulit
Celebration interviewer: Denise Tan

References

External links
PBA official website

2021
2021 PBA season
Meralco Bolts games
Barangay Ginebra San Miguel games
PBA Governors' Cup Finals